The Schneider Doctrine was a political doctrine originally espoused by Chilean General René Schneider, which allowed the election of Salvador Allende as President of Chile, and was the main ideological obstacle to a military coup d'état against him.

Background
General René Schneider was Commander-in-chief of the Chilean Army at the time of the 1970 Chilean presidential election, in which Salvador Allende won a plurality on September 4, 1970, requiring a Congressional vote to declare a winner. At that time the prospect of Salvador Allende winning the Chilean presidency was highly controversial, particularly within the Chilean military, because of his Marxist ideology.

In response to all the public calls that the military received to intervene in the electoral process and prevent Allende's election, General Schneider expressed a profound belief in the apolitical role of the military and a firm opposition to the idea of preventing Allende's inauguration by means of a coup d'état. As a constitutionalist, he wished to preserve the military's apolitical role.

Doctrine

He first enunciated this doctrine at a General Staff meeting on July 23, 1970. He wanted to make clear that "the armed forces are not a road to political power nor an alternative to that power. They exist to guarantee the regular work of the political system and the use of force for any other purpose than its defense constitute high treason".  He reinforced his posture with a public message to the military on September 19, 1970, during the celebrations of Army day and in the midst of the campaign to obtain congressional ratification to Allende's marginal electoral victory, saying that "there were no options that would invite the armed forces to undo what the politicians had wrought in Chile". Nonetheless, he added a colophon: "the only limitation is in the case that the State stopped acting within their own legality. In that case the armed forces have a higher loyalty to the people and are free to decide an abnormal situation beyond the framework of the law".

General Schneider was assassinated on October 24, 1970.  His successor as Army Commander-in-chief, General Carlos Prats, became the spokesman for the "constitutionalists".

Allende used this thesis as one of the bastions of his government, in order to keep the armed forces in line and prevent a possible coup d'état against his government. After General Prats' resignation as Army Commander-in-chief, Allende appointed General Augusto Pinochet as Army Commander-in-Chief, and this thesis was replaced by the notion of "National Security", which, coupled with the Chamber of Deputies Resolution of August 22, 1973, led to the Chilean coup of 1973 on September 11, 1973.

See also
Presidency of Allende
Tacnazo

References

External links
Overview of the historical environment  

Presidency of Salvador Allende
1970s in Chile